Alilem, officially the Municipality of Alilem,  is a 4th class municipality in the province of Ilocos Sur, Philippines. According to the 2020 census, it has a population of 7,361 people.

Etymology
Long before the Spanish colonizers landed on the Philippine shores, there were already natives living in this place.  These people live in huts built on the hillsides located at the northern and eastern parts of the valley.  This was so because the present valley was then the course of the Bakun River.  For many years, the natives lived simply but peacefully.  Such peaceful life did not last forever for it was soon disturbed by an unusual and fearful occurrence in the people's environment.  It all started with the continuous heavy downpour or “LEMLEM” in the native dialect.  This “lemlem” caused the Bakun River to swell to an extraordinary size and overflow its banks.  In the middle part of the river, there was a big “ALICONO” or whirlpool which the people feared so much.  Even after the rains ceased, the ‘alicono’ remained; so the people believed it to Kabunian's (GOD) punishment for their sins.  As it was their custom, the people held native feast called “kaniaw”, the “alicono” vanished and the Bakun River changed its course to the foot of the mountains in the southern part leaving a dry level land suited for residential lots and farms.  The people moved their homes to the valley and named the place ALILEM after the “ALICONO” and “LEMLEM”.

History
Accurate and reliable information on the exact date of the founding of the town cannot be secured because there are no complete historical records available.  However, basing from its information gathered from the old folks, it could be deduced that the town of Alilem was founded sometime after 1820.  What is certainly known only is that the lay-out of the town was done by the Spaniards.  During the Spanish occupation, Alilem was noted for being the center of the district government of “commandancia politico-militar” of Amburayan.  This commandancia was composed of Alilem, Sigay, Suyo, Tagudin, Sudipen, San Gabriel and Bakun.  In 1908, the commandancia of Amburayan became a sub-province of the newly created special capital of the sub-province until the Americans transferred the seat to Tagudin.

Geography

Barangays
Alilem is politically subdivided into 9 barangays. These barangays are headed by elected officials: Barangay Captain, Barangay Council, whose members are called Barangay Councilors. All are elected every three years.
 Alilem Daya (Poblacion)
 Amilongan
 Anaao
 Apang
 Apaya
 Batbato
 Daddaay
 Dalawa
 Kiat

Climate

Demographics

In the 2020 census, Alilem had a population of 7,361.

Economy

Government
Alilem, belonging to the second congressional district of the province of Ilocos Sur, is governed by a mayor designated as its local chief executive and by a municipal council as its legislative body in accordance with the Local Government Code. The mayor, vice mayor, and the councilors are elected directly by the people through an election which is being held every three years.

Elected officials

References

External links
Municipal Government of Alilem, Ilocos Sur
Pasyalang Ilocos Sur
Philippine Standard Geographic Code
Philippine Census Information
Local Governance Performance Management System

Municipalities of Ilocos Sur